Timeless Tales from Hallmark is an American live-action/animated direct-to-video series of fairy tale adaptations hosted by Olivia Newton-John, produced by Hanna-Barbera and Hallmark Cards. Eight videocassettes were released between 1990 and 1991, and the series aired on USA Network in December 1991.

Overview
Olivia Newton-John introduced a series of eight fairy tales for children followed by an environmental message in 1990. Each of the eight videocassettes contained an eight-page booklet with recycling tips; for example, you could recycle the video box printed on eco-friendly paper. The purpose of the franchise was to teach children how to handle Earth's resources responsibly.

The series ran for six episodes in 1990 and two episodes in 1991, released by Hanna-Barbera Home Video.

Cast

Main
Olivia Newton-John – Hostess (1990)
Elisabeth Harnois – Emily (1990)
Jeremy Yablan – Kevin (1990)

Voice cast

Ruta Lee – Scarlotta (Rapunzel)
Linda Purl – Rapunzel (Rapunzel)
Michael Rupert – Prince (Rapunzel)
Kath Soucie – Teddy Bear, Rapunzel's mother, Baby Rapunzel (Rapunzel)
Mark L. Taylor
Michael Bell – Toad, King of the Flower Elves (Thumbelina)
Hamilton Camp – Rumpelstiltzkin
Keene Curtis – Baron (Rumpelstiltzkin)
Alan Oppenheimer – King (Rumpelstiltzkin)
Lorna Patterson
William Schallert
Russi Taylor
Gregg Berger
Victoria Carroll
Linda Gary
Vicki Juditz
Kenneth Mars
Dom DeLuise – Emperor (The Emperor's New Clothes)
Henry Gibson – Sir Buffoon (The Emperor's New Clothes)
Richard Erdman
Ed Gilbert – Wolf Knight (The Emperor's New Clothes)
Paul Kreppel
Edie McClurg – Mathilda (The Emperor's New Clothes)
Bradley Pierce – Boy Rabbit (The Emperor's New Clothes)
Robert Ridgely – Sir Slippery (The Emperor's New Clothes)
Frank Welker – Artie (The Emperor's New Clothes), Monkey Messenger (The Emperor's New Clothes), Wolf (The Emperor's New Clothes), Louie (The Steadfast Tin Soldier)
Charlie Adler – Ugly Duckling, Crocodile #1 (The Ugly Duckling)
Darleen Carr – Duckling #2, Swan #2 (The Ugly Duckling)
Nancy Cartwright – Duckling #1, Brown Duckling #2 (The Ugly Duckling)
Jennifer Darling – Swan #1 (The Ugly Duckling)
Paul Eiding – Rabbit with green shirt and red tie (The Ugly Duckling)
Jerry Houser – Male Duck (The Ugly Duckling)
Tress MacNeille – Duckling #4, Mother Duck, Widow Duck, Green Mallard Duck (The Ugly Duckling)
Pat Musick – Duckling #5, Rabbit with glasses (The Ugly Duckling)
Rob Paulsen – Runabout, Duckling #3, Crocodile #2 (The Ugly Duckling)
Susan Silo – Yellow Duck, Brown Duckling #1, Swan #3 (The Ugly Duckling)
JoBeth Williams – Bettina (The Elves and the Shoemaker)
Ed Begley Jr. – Bertram (The Elves and the Shoemaker)
Susan Blu
B.J. Ward
René Auberjonois
Marietta DePrima
Jeff Doucette
Archie Hahn
Ken Campbell – Puss in Boots
Kip King
Clive Revill
Lara Teeter
Paul Williams – Frogbrauten (The Steadfast Tin Soldier)
Tim Curry – Jack (The Steadfast Tin Soldier)
George Newbern – Tin Soldier
Dan Gilvezan
Paige Gosney
Edan Gross
Megan Mullally – Ballerina (The Steadfast Tin Soldier)

Episodes

References

External links
 

Direct-to-video film series
1990 direct-to-video films
1991 direct-to-video films
1990s animated short films
Direct-to-video fantasy films
Direct-to-video adventure films
Films based on fairy tales
Children's film series
Hanna-Barbera animated films
Hallmark Cards
Olivia Newton-John
Warner Bros. direct-to-video animated films